Göte Augustin Almqvist (25 June 1921 in Skellefteå, Sweden - 21 December 1994 in Skellefteå, Sweden) was a Swedish ice hockey player who represented his country at the 1952 Winter Olympics in Oslo, winning the bronze medal in the team competition. He was born on 25 July 1921 and died on 21 December 1994 in Skellefteå, Västerbotten County. He played his club hockey for Skellefteå AIK.

References 

1921 births
1994 deaths
Ice hockey players at the 1952 Winter Olympics
Medalists at the 1952 Winter Olympics
Olympic bronze medalists for Sweden
Olympic ice hockey players of Sweden
Olympic medalists in ice hockey
People from Skellefteå Municipality
Skellefteå AIK players
Sportspeople from Västerbotten County